Nikolai Andreevich Kislyakov (1901–1973) was a Soviet ethnologist and who specialised in cultures of the Near and Middle East and Western Central Asia, particularly Persian and Tajik).

In 1937 he became head of the Department of Europe, Caucasus and Western Central Asia in the Museum of Anthropology, Archaeology and Ethnography, part of the Institute of Anthropology, Archaeology and Ethnography

Publications
 Sketches on Karoteghin History Stalinabad, 1954

1901 births
1973 deaths